Israel competed at the 2018 Summer Youth Olympics, in Buenos Aires, Argentina from 6 October to 18 October 2018.

Medalists

Athletics

Israel qualified three athletes.

Boys
Track & road events

Field Events

Girls
Field Events

Cycling

The ranks of the Israelis cyclists at the 2017 men junior XCO mountain bike world championships place Israel at the 7th place. This position qualified two cyclists for Israel.

Team

Gymnastics

Acrobatic
Israel qualified a mixed pair based on its performance at the 2018 Acrobatic Gymnastics World Championship.

Pairs

Artistic
Israel qualified one gymnast based on Uri Zeiadel performance at the European qualification event as part of the 2018 European Junior Championship. Zeiadel finish at the 23rd place on the individual all-around event with 73.265 points. This score place Israel at the 15th place.

Boys

Rhythmic
Israel qualified one rhythmic gymnast based on Valeriia Sotskova performance at the European qualification event. Sotskova finish at the 5th place on the individual all-around event.

Individual

Judo

Israel qualified one athlete based on its position at the IJF cadet WRL.

Individual

Team

Sailing

Israel qualified two boats based on its performance at the 2017 World Techno 293+ Championships. Naama Gazit finished at the 4th place and earned one quota places for the Israeli delegation in the girls’ event. Bar Navri finished at the 9th place and earned one quota places for the Israeli delegation in the boys’ event.

Swimming

Israel qualified four athlete based on its performance at the 17th FINA World Championships in Budapest.

Boys

Girls

Mixed

Taekwondo

The 2018 World Youth Championship in Taekwondo took place in April in Tunisia. In contrast to the Olympic Charter, Israeli athletes were prevented from entering Tunisia and their ability to achieve the Olympic criterion was impaired. In light of this, and after the demand of the Olympic Committee of Israel, two Israeli athletes Avishag Semberg and Tom Pashcovsky received a free ticket to the Youth Olympics. But eventually Daniel Goichman was received the free ticket in Pashcovsky place.

Boys

Girls

Triathlon

Itamar Levanon finished at the 8th place with a total time of 55:44 minutes at the 2018 European Youth Olympic Games Qualifier held in Banyoles, Spain. Israel qualified one athlete based on Levanon's performance.

Individual

Relay

References

2018 in Israeli sport
Nations at the 2018 Summer Youth Olympics
Israel at the Youth Olympics